Absorption may refer to:

Chemistry and biology
Absorption (biology), digestion
Absorption (small intestine)
Absorption (chemistry), diffusion of particles of gas or liquid into liquid or solid materials
Absorption (skin), a route by which substances enter the body through the skin
Absorption (pharmacology), absorption of drugs into the body

Physics and chemical engineering
Absorption (acoustics), absorption of sound waves by a material
Absorption (electromagnetic radiation), absorption of light or other electromagnetic radiation by a material
Absorption air conditioning, a type of solar air conditioning
Absorption refrigerator, a refrigerator that runs on surplus heat rather than electricity
Dielectric absorption, the inability of a charged capacitor to completely discharge when briefly discharged

Mathematics and economics
Absorption (economics), the total demand of an economy for goods and services both from within and without
Absorption (logic), one of the rules of inference
Absorption costing, or total absorption costing, a method for appraising or valuing a firm's total inventory by including all the manufacturing costs incurred to produce those goods
Absorbing element, in mathematics, an element that does not change when it is combined in a binary operation with some other element
Absorption law, in mathematics, an identity linking a pair of binary operations

See also

Adsorption, the formation of a gas or liquid film on a solid surface
CO2 scrubber, device which absorbs carbon dioxide from circulated gas
Digestion, the uptake of substances by the gastrointestinal tract
Absorption (psychology), a state of becoming absorbed by mental imagery or fantasy
Flow (psychology), a state of total mental "absorption"